The Musée des Arts décoratifs (Museum of Decorative Arts) is a museum dedicated to the exhibition and preservation of the decorative arts.  Located at 107 Rue de Rivoli in the 1st arrondissement of Paris, the museum occupies the most north-western wing of the Louvre Palace, known as the Pavillon de Marsan. With over one million objects in its collection, the Musée des Arts décoratifs is the largest museum of decorative arts in continental Europe.

Displays

The museum collection was founded in 1905 by members of the “Union des arts décoratifs”. The architect was Gaston Redon. It houses and displays furniture, interior design, altarpieces, religious paintings, objets d'arts, tapestries, wallpaper, ceramics and glassware, plus toys from the Middle Ages to the present day.

The museum's deep holdings range back to 13th-century Europe.  Today's collection is primarily composed of French furniture, tableware, carpets such as those from Aubusson, porcelain such as that by the Manufacture nationale de Sèvres, and many glass pieces  by René Lalique, Émile Gallé and many others. It includes numerous works in the Art Nouveau and Art Déco styles and modern examples by designers like Eileen Gray and Charlotte Perriand. Pieces by Camille Fauré can also be found in the permanent collection.

Of interest to the public are the period rooms. Examples include part of Jeanne Lanvin's house (decorated by Albert-Armand Rateau [1884–1938] in the early 1920s) at 16 rue Barbet-de-Jouy in Paris. Others are graphic artist Eugène Grasset's dining room of 1880, and the 1752 Gold Cabinet of Avignon. And, peculiar to a French museum it seems, there is the 1875 bedroom of courtesan Lucie Émilie Delabigne, purportedly the inspiration for the main character in Émile Zola's novel Nana (1880).

There is a distinctive ceiling there once owned by Jeanne Baptiste d'Albert de Luynes, mistress of then duke of Savoy.

Exhibitions
Some of the museum's vast number of exhibitions have been distinguished. Yvonne Brunhammer, a curator and then director of the museum for over four decades from the early 1950s and the person who rediscovered Eileen Gray, organized the 1966 exhibition, "Les Années '25': Art Déco/Bauhaus/Stijl Esprit Nouveau". The exhibition served to coin "Art Déco", the term that came to describe design between the World Wars, particularly French modern design.

The museum is somewhat on a par with similar and venerable decorative-arts and design-focused institutions such as the more international Victoria and Albert Museum in London and was the inspiration for the Hewitt sisters' collection in the Cooper Union (the ancestor of the no-longer-affiliated Cooper-Hewitt, National Design Museum) in New York City. However, due to many fine-art, publicity, fashion and design exhibitions mounted at the Paris museum, its focus has been diluted and caused its name, Musée des "Art décoratifs", to be a misnomer. Thus, its name for popular use became MAD (mode, arts, design or, in English, fashion, arts, design) in January 2016, even though the acronym is the same as MAD (Museum of Arts and Design) in New York City.

Renovation
The Musée des Arts décoratifs was closed from 1996 to 2006 due to a renovation of the building and of about 6,000 works from the collection; the renovation cost €35 million (about $45 million in 2006). The museum reopened on September 15, 2006. Béatrice Salmon, the current director and overseer of the restoration, has called the collection "the history of French taste and of the decorative arts and design in France" and has suggested: "People [in France] understand how to relate to paintings and sculpture in a museum, but they don't know how to interpret objects".

Pierre-Alexis Dumas, a principal of Hermès International and the president of the Fondation Hermès, was elected president in 2015. He succeeded Bruno Roger.

See also 

 List of museums in Paris

References

Sources
 Anon. (1984). Chefs d'œuvre du Musée des Arts Décoratifs, Paris: Musée des Arts Décoratifs, 
 Brunhammer, Yvonne (1992). Le beau dans l'utile: Un musée pour les arts décoratifs, Paris: Gallimard, 
 Salmon, Béatrice (2006). Chefs-d'oeuvre du musée des Arts décoratifs, Paris: Les Arts Décoratifs,   
 Rawsthorne, Alice. "A Paris Mecca of the decorative arts opens anew", International Herald Tribune, September 3, 2006

External links
 Website for Musée des Arts Décoratifs

Arts Decoratifs
Decorative arts museums in France
Arts Decoratifs
Art museums established in 1905
1905 establishments in France
Buildings and structures in the 1st arrondissement of Paris
Louvre Palace
Les Arts Décoratifs